Cecropterus cincta, the chisos banded skipper, is a species of dicot skipper in the butterfly family Hesperiidae. It is found in Central America and North America.

References

Further reading

 
 

Autochton (butterfly)
Articles created by Qbugbot
Butterflies described in 1882
Butterflies of Central America
Butterflies of North America